The Jammu and Kashmir Reorganisation Act, 2019 is an act of the parliament of India containing provisions to reconstitute the Indian-administered state of Jammu and Kashmir into two Indian-administered union territories (UTs) called Jammu and Kashmir, and Ladakh, and becoming effective on 31 October 2019. A bill for the act was introduced by the Minister of Home Affairs, Amit Shah, in the Rajya Sabha on 5 August 2019 and was passed on the same day. It was then passed by the Lok Sabha on 6 August 2019 and it received the president's assent on 9 August 2019.

The act consists of 103 clauses, extends 106 central laws to the UTs, repeals 153 state laws, and abolishes the Jammu and Kashmir Legislative Council among other things. The introduction of the bill was preceded by a presidential order which indirectly amended Article 370 of the Indian constitution and revoked Jammu and Kashmir's special status. The act has also given powers to the central government to pass a number of executive orders in relation to both the union territories. These orders have resulted in the modification or repeal of over 400 state and central laws with respect to the union territories. The act has been challenged in court through a number of petitions.

The combination of the presidential orders and enactment of the Reorganisation Act was followed by a security lockdown and communications blackout. After August 2019, China and Pakistan made statements opposing India's changes. Calls for the restoration of statehood have been made in India.

Background

Article 370 of the Indian constitution gave Jammu and Kashmir special status. In contrast to other states of India, Jammu and Kashmir had its own constitution and a substantially higher degree of administrative autonomy. In particular, Indian citizens from other states could not purchase land or property in Jammu and Kashmir.

Jammu and Kashmir had three distinct areas: overwhelmingly Muslim-majority Kashmir Valley (95% Muslim) with a population of nearly 7 million people, a Hindu-majority (66%) Jammu with a population of 5.35 million people and a 30% Muslim population, and Ladakh, which has sparse population of 287,000 people, a Muslim plurality, or relative majority, at 46%, and a Buddhist minority at 40% (with Hindus making up 12%). Violence and unrest persisted in the Indian-administered Muslim majority areas and, following a disputed state election in 1987, an insurgency persisted in protest over autonomy and rights. The Bharatiya Janata Party (BJP) came to power in the 2014 Indian general election and had included in their 2019 election manifesto the revocation of Article 370 of the Constitution of India.

Prior to the introduction of the bill and the revocation of the state's special status, the central government put the Kashmir Valley on lock-down, with a surge in security forces, imposition of Section 144 preventing assembly, and the placement of political leaders such as former Jammu and Kashmir chief ministers Omar Abdullah and Mehbooba Mufti under house arrest. The State had been first under governor's rule and then under president's rule since 20 June 2018, after the coalition government headed by Mehbooba Mufti lost support from the Bharatiya Janata Party. Additional 35,000 paramilitary troops were deployed to Jammu and Kashmir, prior to which a warning was issued to annual Hindu pilgrims and tourists citing a terror threat. The imposition of restrictions included the blocking of internet and phone services. The preemptive moves preceded the revocation of the state's special status and the passage of the Reorganisation Act.

Statutory provisions

The Jammu and Kashmir Reorganisation Act divides the Indian-administered state into two Indian-administered union territories, Jammu and Kashmir, and Ladakh. Whereas the former, Jammu and Kashmir, will have a legislative assembly, the latter, Ladakh, will be administered by a lieutenant governor alone. The union territory of Ladakh will include the districts of Leh and Kargil, while all other districts will be accorded to Jammu and Kashmir. Of six Lok Sabha seats allocated to the former state, one will be allocated to Ladakh and five to the Jammu and Kashmir union territory. The High Court of Jammu and Kashmir will function as the High Court for both the union territories.

The act provides that the administration of the Jammu and Kashmir will be as per Article 239A of the Indian constitution. Article 239A, originally formulated for the union territory of Puducherry, will also be applicable to Jammu and Kashmir. A lieutenant governor appointed by the president will administer the union territory of Jammu and Kashmir, which will have a legislative assembly of 107 to 114 members. The legislative assembly may make laws for any of the matters in the state list except "public order" and "police", which will remain as the law-making powers of the union government.  A council of ministers including a chief minister will be appointed by the lieutenant governor from the members of the legislative assembly, with the role to advise the lieutenant governor in the exercise of functions in matters under the legislative assembly's jurisdiction. In other matters, the lieutenant governor is empowered to act in his own capacity, who will also have the power to promulgate ordinances having the same force as acts enacted by the legislature. The act abolishes the Legislative Council of the state of Jammu and Kashmir. It comprises 103 clauses which extend 106 central laws and 7 amended state laws, in part or as a whole, to the two union territories. The act also repeals 153 state laws and Governor's Acts.

Enactment 

The passage of the Reorganisation Act, 2019 was part of a combination of moves by the government of India, including a presidential order C.O. 272 dated 5 August 2019 and a presidential declaration C.O. 273 dated 6 August 2019, aided by a parliamentary majority. These two orders together revoked the special status heretofore enjoyed by the state of Jammu and Kashmir.

C.O. 272, C.O. 273, statutory resolutions 
Presidential order C.O. 272 and presidential declaration C.O. 273 resulted in the indirect and complete change of  Article 370, the foundation on which the state had a special status. The 'indirect' amendment refers changes to Article 367 via C.O. 272 dated 5 August 2019; it caused all references to the Constituent Assembly of Jammu and Kashmir in Article 370(3) to be interpreted as the Legislative Assembly of Jammu and Kashmir.

As the state was under President's Rule at the time, the powers of the Legislative Assembly were entrusted to the Parliament of India. With this done, on the same day after C.O. 272 was issued, the Upper House of the Indian parliament passed a statutory resolution under Article 370(3) endorsing the same. The statutory resolution recommended that most of Article 370 cease to be operative, except the one which says that all provisions and amendments of the Constitution of India would be applicable to the state of Jammu and Kashmir. The next day, C.O. 273 put into effect Rajya Sabha's recommendation. C.O. 272 also supersedes the 1954 presidential order and has led to the abrogation of the Constitution of Jammu and Kashmir and Article 35A of the Constitution of India.

Voting in Parliament 
The bill was introduced by Amit Shah, the Minister of Home Affairs, in the Rajya Sabha on 5 August 2019. Opposition was seen, two members of the Jammu and Kashmir People's Democratic Party (PDP) tore up copies of the Indian constitution in protest, following which they were suspended from the House; 13 members of the All India Trinamool Congress walked out of the House; and 6 members of Janata Dal (United) (allied to the ruling BJP) boycotted the voting. Opposition was also seen from Dravidian Progressive Federation, Nationalist Congress Party, Communist Party of India and Communist Party of India (Marxist). However, the bill acquired the support of Bahujan Samaj Party, YSR Congress Party, Telugu Desam Party and the Aam Aadmi Party. Along with the 107 members of the ruling National Democratic Alliance, the number of supporting parliamentarians totaled to 117. The bill also acquired the support of some independent and nominated members. It was passed by the Rajya Sabha with 125 members in favour and 61 members against.

The bill was introduced in the lower house of Indian parliament, Lok Sabha on 6 August 2019. The All India Trinamool Congress and Janata Dal (United) walked out from the house, while Indian National Congress, Nationalist Congress Party and Samajwadi Party opposed the bill; Bharatiya Janata Party, Shiv Sena, Biju Janata Dal, Telangana Rashtra Samithi, Shiromani Akali Dal, Lok Janshakti Party, Bahujan Samaj Party and others supported it. The bill was passed by the house with 370 votes in favour and 70 votes against.

Assent and publication 
The bill received the assent of the president on 9 August 2019, subsequent to which it was published in The Gazette of India on the same date. A notification published on the same day provided for the union territories to come into effect from 31 October 2019.

The two union territories came into existence on 31 October 2019, which is celebrated as National Unity Day (marking the birth anniversary of Sardar Vallabhai Patel, who had a major role in the political integration of India). The president of India appointed a lieutenant governor for the Union Territory of Jammu and Kashmir and a lieutenant governor for the Union Territory of Ladakh. Both the lieutenant governors were sworn in by Justice Gita Mittal, the chief justice of Jammu and Kashmir (and Ladakh) High Court, on 31 October 2019, first at Leh and then at Srinagar. President's rule was revoked following bifurcation and newly applied to the union territories through the lieutenant governors.

Legal challenges 

From 9 August 2019 onwards, a number of petitions were filed that challenged the validity of the act. This includes petitions by members of parliament, former bureaucrats and military officers, advocates, lawyers, activists and non-governmental organisations. Members of parliament Mohammad Akbar Lone and Hasnain Masoodi of Jammu and Kashmir National Conference filed a petition in the Supreme Court on 10 August 2019 challenging the presidential orders and the Reorganisation Act 2019 together. With regard to the Reorganisation Act 2019 the petition challenges the downgrading of representation, the degradation and unilateral changes to constitutionalized federalism through the change from statehood to a union territory, and the right to autonomy as per the constitution. Further, the Reorganisation Act 2019 is challenged to be invalid as the presidential orders are also questionable. There are multiple reasons given for the invalidity of the presidential orders, including unconstitutionally using an article to amend itself in a way other than what was written in the constitution, making changes unilaterally, going against articles in the Constitution of Jammu and Kashmir, constitutional morality and arbitrariness. Jammu and Kashmir People's Conference has also challenged the presidential orders in court, deeming them invalid as per articles 14, 19 and 21 of the Indian Constitution, and that the will of the people of Jammu and Kashmir has not appropriately been taken into account. Further, as the changes were made during Governor's Rule, a temporary representative of the Union government itself, making permanent changes was unconstitutional.

On 5 August 2019, the Home Minister had stated that the reorganisation could be lifted and statehood restored. In October 2019, a spokesperson for the United Nations High Commissioner for Human Rights, Rupert Colville, stated that "The Supreme Court of India has been slow to deal with petitions concerning habeas corpus, freedom of movement and media restrictions". The Supreme Court stated that it would hear related pleas after its summer vacation in 2022.

Reactions and aftermath 

On 4 August 2019, People's Alliance for Gupkar Declaration, an alliance of several political parties in Jammu and Kashmir, unanimously passed a resolution—  "That all the parties would be united in their resolve to protect and defend the identity, autonomy and special status of J&K against all attacks and onslaughts whatsoever. That modification, abrogation of Articles 35A, 370, unconstitutional delimitation or trifurcation of the State would be an aggression against the people of Jammu, Kashmir and Ladakh". On 5 and 6 August 2019, cross-party support for the creation of the union territory of Ladakh was seen in Leh, however Kargil leaders voiced opposition to its creation.

Gupkar Alliance passed another declaration to the same effect as the one in 2019 on 22 August 2020. Farooq Abdullah was released from preventive detention on 13 March 2020, Omar Abdullah on 24 March 2020 and Mehbooba Mufti on 13 October 2020. In Ladakh, by October 2020, a certain amount of apprehension over its status as a union territory had developed due to subsequent legislation and fears of losing jobs and land. The Leh unit of the BJP passed a resolution in the Ladakh Autonomous Hill Development Council to the same effect. Those in Kargil also continued with their disapproval of being included into the union territory of Ladakh. On 3 August 2020, P Chidambaram wrote "All major fundamental rights are effectively suspended" and that there was a "new" Kashmir issue, as opposed to the 1947 one before. Solidarity events between "Kashmiri and Palestinian networks" were also seen.

Movement and communication restrictions 

A security lockdown and communications blackout was extended throughout the new union territories in a pre-emptive manner. Restrictions in Kashmir continued for a longer duration than those in Jammu. Some parts of Jammu saw restrictions being lifted a few days later. Government of India data showed that thousands of arrests were made. Politicians, including three former Chief Ministers of Jammu and Kashmir, were put under preventive detention. The press in the region was heavily impacted. According to Access Now, the communications blackout was the longest any democracy has ever seen.

Civil society 
Anger, betrayal, fear, anxiety and humiliation were some of the prominent emotions in Kashmir in the days post 5–6 August 2019. A fact finding team including Jean Drèze and Kavita Krishnan reported that "People expressed their anger freely in informal conversation, but no-one was willing to speak on camera", children were heard calling Modi 'Iblees' (meaning 'Satan'), and a man in Sopore said that the situation was "silence at gunpoint", and the peace was the "peace of a graveyard", while someone else said "It's Army rule not Modi rule". The newspaper Greater Kashmir had two pages devoted to the cancellation of weddings. With regard to pellet injuries, the fact finding team met two people with pellet injuries at SMHS Hospital. According to rights' groups, 412 habeas corpus petitions challenging detentions under the Jammu and Kashmir Public Safety Act, 1978 were filed after 5 August 2019.

National and international media 

International media frequently referred to the situation as a nuclear flashpoint.

In a statement BBC said that they "... strongly refute any claims that we have misrepresented events in Kashmir." Sevanti Ninan explains to ThePrint "For the foreign press, Kashmir is both a conflict zone, and disputed territory, and it covers it as such. After Kashmir’s change of status, they think it is their job to capture protests, not to pander to the Indian government’s sensitivities." Brahma Chellaney explains that this internationalisation was normal and that the real failure was the minimal number of Indians who wrote on international issues.

China and border skirmishes 
On 6 August 2019, Chinese foreign affairs spokeswoman Hua Chunying opposed the integration of the "Chinese territory in the western sector of the China-India boundary" into India's administrative jurisdiction. In early October 2019, Chinese President Xi Jinping released a statement saying that the situation in Kashmir was being observed and that Pakistan had the support of China. On 31 October 2019, the Chinese Foreign ministry said that India's decision to unilaterally change its domestic laws and administrative divisions is void, illegal and will not affect "the fact that the area (Aksai Chin) is under Chinese actual control". In June 2020, Wang Shida of China Institutes of Contemporary International Relations linked the 2020–2021 China–India skirmishes to India's decision to change the status of Jammu, Kashmir and Ladakh. Indian diplomat Gautam Bambawale and Pravin Sawhney also held the same reasoning. A spokesman of the Embassy of the People's Republic of China in the Islamic Republic of Pakistan also linked the two in a tweet.

Restoration of statehood, delimitation and elections 

The first elections in the union territory of Jammu and Kashmir took place in the last two months of 2020 in the form of by-elections to District Development Councils and municipal and panchayat level bodies. Even though 220 candidates were fielded by the Gupkar Alliance, some of those elected were dissatisfied post elections, accusing the government of creating a powerless body.

A fresh delimitation process for assembly constituencies began in February–March 2020. The Reorganisation Act has complicated the delimitation, with suspicion being created over whether the new seats would go to Kashmir or Jammu. At an all-party meet of Jammu and Kashmir leaders in New Delhi on 24 June 2021, statehood, delimitation and elections were discussed. During the meeting, restoration of statehood was raised; this was acknowledged by both the Prime Minister and the Home Minister.

Killings and militant recruitment 
Between August 2019 and August 2021, 23 BJP leaders and workers (12 in Kashmir and 11 in Jammu) were killed. In the first six months of 2021, 89 militants died in roughly 47 gunfights in Kashmir. During October 2021, 13 civilians were killed; the highest death toll in a single month in the past two years, leading to the exodus of hundreds of migrant labourers and their families. Militant recruitment still occurs. Cross-border cease-fire violations along the Line of Control still occur resulting in deaths of civilians and security forces. While India's Multi-Agency Centre estimated that 55 terrorists crossed the LoC post 5 August in 2019, the military put the number much lower, adding that many infiltration attempts had been thwarted. In 2020, 60 security men were killed in the region.

Fundamental rights, human rights and civil rights 
Members of 'The Forum for Human Rights in Jammu and Kashmir' came out with three reports post August 2019. The informal group, concerned about the situation of human rights in the state, included Justice Madan Lokur, Justice Hasnain Masoodi, Justice Ruma Pal, Justice Bilal Nazki, Justice Ajit Prakash Shah, Radha Kumar, Nirupama Rao, Shantha Sinha, Ramachandra Guha, Moosa Raza, Air Vice-Marshal (retd) Kapil Kak, Lieutenant-General (retd) H S Panag, Major-General (retd) Ashok K. Mehta and others. The first report, while condemning the situation of human rights in the state and that security concerns were being placed first, recommended— (sic) "release all remaining political detainees", "repeal the PSA and any other preventive detention legislation", "remove all restrictions on freedom of representation and expression", "release all detained juveniles and withdraw charges against them", "allow smooth passage for medical personnel and patients", "reinstate all the former state's statutory oversight bodies, especially those monitoring human rights, such as the Jammu and Kashmir Human Rights Commission", "encourage all shades of opinion to be freely and peacefully expressed, as the laws apply in every part of the Indian Union". The second report covered the period August 2020– January 2021 and stated that "most of the violations described in the forum's first report... remain even 18 months after the imposition of a lockdown on Jammu and Kashmir". The third report was published in August 2021, marking the completion of two years of changes in the state. The findings of the third report include:

However, considering the regions history including ethnic cleansing, many today still place public security, safety and order as paramount. In October 2019, India invited a group of largely right-wing MEP's, in their personal capacity, to the Kashmir Valley to see the on-ground situation. A third foreign delegation visited the region in February 2021; the envoys represented various countries including Brazil, Malaysia, Bolivia, Ghana and Kyrgyzstan.

Michelle Bachelet, the United Nations High Commissioner for Human Rights, put out a comment in September 2021, expressing concerns about the human rights situation in the state including the communication blackouts and stated,

The Supreme Court of India also stated "freedom of internet access is a fundamental right" and that internet restrictions could not continue indefinitely.

Subsequent legislation

Orders 
Following the implementation of the Jammu and Kashmir Reorganisation Act, 2019, and through the powers given by the act, the central government of India further approved eight orders which provide for the adaption of state and central laws to the union territories. Five orders deal with the union territory of Jammu and Kashmir and three with the union territory of Ladakh. Through these executive orders the central government has made changes to, or repealed, over 400 laws in relation to the union territories by November 2020.

Changes to domicile legislation 
The Jammu and Kashmir Reorganisation (Adaptation of State Laws) Order, 2020 dated 31 March 2020 resulted in the complete repeal of 25 prior state laws. The remaining 113 state laws were adopted with changes. This move by the central government came under specific criticism for the changes to the Jammu and Kashmir Civil Services (Decentralization and Recruitment) Act, 2010 which resulted in a modification to the states' domicile laws. Previously, Article 370 reserved land and jobs only for 'permanent residents', the definition of which was altered to include domiciles through the approval of the new order. Under the new laws domiciles would be given jobs in the state. Among the various criteria under the modified law anybody who has "resided for a period of fifteen years in the Union territory of Jammu and Kashmir" or migrants registered by the Relief and Rehabilitation Commissioner of the union territory would be eligible for a domicile. A number of political parties including Jammu and Kashmir Apni Party and the Jammu unit of BJP opposed the order and showed discontentment, stating that there were no safeguards to protect the rights and privileges of the people of Jammu and Kashmir. On 3 April 2020, a fresh order was issued by the central government that made six changes to the previous order. Among the changes were providing protection to domiciles in any government post as compared to only selected posts before. A new order, the Jammu and Kashmir Reorganisation (Adaptation of State Laws) Second Order, 2020 was passed on 20 May 2020. This order modified applicability of domicile orders to "all level of jobs" in the union territory.

Jammu division saw 33,157 people applying for the domicile document between 18 May 2020 and 26 June 2020. Among them 25,000 domicile certificates were issued. Out of those applying, about 32,000 application were from Jammu, while Kashmir saw only 720 applications. Refugees from Pakistan and Valmikis are among those who have been issued the residency certificates; they came in the 1950s when sanitation workers in Jammu went on strike.

These changes in domicile rules have been compared academically to "post-colonial colonialism" and reinforcing settler colonialism in the region, and Patrick Wolfe's models of colonialism. Kashmiri author and academician Ather Zia holds the same views, "settler-colonial techniques in Kashmir predate the foreboding of the siege of August 2019". On the other hand, the change in residency rules have been seen to correct past injustices. For the first time, women from Jammu and Kashmir who married outside the state, can get domiciles. The spouse of natives can also apply for domicile.

Changes to land legislation 
On 26 October 2020, the Union Territory of Jammu and Kashmir Reorganisation (Adaptation of Central Laws) Third Order, 2020 came into force. ANI reported that under the orders  "12 state laws have been repealed and 26 others have been adapted with changes or substitutes". Among the changes were modifications to the land laws which now allowed those from other states to buy land in the UT. By August 2021, two people from outside of the union territory had bought property.

Amendments 
G Kishan Reddy, the Minister of State for Home Affairs, introduced the Jammu and Kashmir Reorganisation (Amendment) Bill, 2021 to replace the existing ordinance for the same. The ordinance merged the Jammu and Kashmir cadre of civil services officers with the Arunachal Pradesh, Goa, Mizoram Union Territory (AGMUT) cadre. By 13 February 2021, both houses of the Parliament had passed the bill.

References and notes 
Notes

References

Further reading 

 

—

External links 
 Full text of the Jammu and Kashmir Reorganisation Act 2019 via Gazette of India.
Alphabetical Index of Central Acts extended by J&K Reorganisation Act 2019 via Jammu and Kashmir High Court.
Orders Issued Under the Constitution of India (Part 1) via Legislative Department, Ministry of Law and Justice, Government of India.
 Full text of the Jammu and Kashmir Reorganisation (Adaptation of State Laws) Order, 2020 via Gazette of India.

Acts of the Parliament of India 2019
Reorganisation of Indian states
Government of Jammu and Kashmir
2019 in Indian politics
History of Ladakh